Heteralcis isochra is a moth in the family Lecithoceridae. It was described by Edward Meyrick in 1908. It is found in Assam, India. and Sri Lanka.

The wingspan is 12–14 mm. The forewings are light ochreous yellowish with four somewhat oblique rather broad undefined fasciae of deeper ochreous or brownish suffusion, the first sometimes rather dark fuscous, the second narrowest. The hindwings are light ochreous yellowish, with a subdorsal groove enclosing a long pencil of ochreous-yellowish hairs.

References

Moths described in 1908
Heteralcis
Taxa named by Edward Meyrick